The budgetary rule is a rule concerning the usage of capital gains from The Government Pension Fund - Global of Norway. The rule states that a maximum of 3% of the fund's value should be allocated to the yearly government budget. Its main stated justification is to avoid the Dutch disease in the Norwegian economy due to the large influx of oil-sourced revenue. It is believed that the fund will grow with more than 3% yearly over time, which makes it possible to allocate up to 3% to the yearly budget without decreasing the value of the fund.

The rule was introduced in 2001 during the First cabinet Stoltenberg, and has a broad cross-party support.

The rule was last changed from 4% to 3% February 2017. Every party in the parliament was in favour of the change, except the right wing Progress Party (Norway).

See also
Golden Rule (fiscal policy)

References

External links
 About the government pension fund, from the Norwegian government

Energy economics
Energy in Norway
Public finance of Norway
2001 introductions
2001 establishments in Norway